Oliva spicata, common name the veined olive, is a species of sea snail, a marine gastropod mollusk in the family Olividae, the olives.

Subspecies and varieties
 Oliva spicata deynzerae Petuch & Sargent, 1986: synonym of Americoliva deynzerae (Petuch & Sargent, 1986): synonym of Oliva deynzerae Petuch & Sargent, 1986 (basionym)
 Oliva spicata var. hemphilli Ford in Johnson, 1915: synonym of Oliva spicata spicata (Röding, 1798) represented as Oliva spicata (Röding, 1798)
 Oliva spicata var. perfecta Johnson, 1911: synonym of Oliva spicata spicata (Röding, 1798) represented as Oliva spicata (Röding, 1798)

Description

The length of the shell varies between 25 mm and 85 mm

Distribution
This marine species occurs between the Gulf of California and Peru.

References

 Duclos P.L. (1844-1848). Oliva. In J.C. Chenu, Illustrations conchyliologiques ou description et figures de toutes les coquilles connues vivantes et fossiles, classées suivant le système de Lamarck modifié d'après les progrès de la science et comprenant les genres nouveaux et les espèces récemment découvertes: 5-28

External links
 Röding, P.F. (1798). Museum Boltenianum sive Catalogus cimeliorum e tribus regnis naturæ quæ olim collegerat Joa. Fried Bolten, M. D. p. d. per XL. annos proto physicus Hamburgensis. Pars secunda continens Conchylia sive Testacea univalvia, bivalvia & multivalvia. Trapp, Hamburg. viii, 199 pp.
 Reeve, L. A. (1850). Monograph of the genus Oliva. In: Conchologia Iconica, or, illustrations of the shells of molluscous animals, vol. 6, pl. 1-30 and unpaginated text. L. Reeve & Co., London.

spicata